Dafor is a village in the Biakoye district of the Volta Region of Ghana.

References

Populated places in the Volta Region